Kobzarskyi Tsekh (Kobzars'kyi Tsekh), literally "Kobzar guild", is an organization of kobzars, which have existed since the 17th century in Ukraine.

In Ukraine, blind travelling musicians, known as kobzars or lirnyks, organized themselves into guilds similarly to professional craftsmen. These musicians would gather at regular meeting spots on particular dates to celebrate religious feasts, administer examinations for the induction of novices and masters, and collect money for placement of votive candles under icons of patron saints and to also discuss the business of the guild.

From 1932 until the collapse of the Soviet Union in 1991, kobzars were effectively outlawed, and many were put to death. 

After Ukraine regained independence from Russia, the idea for the creation of a Kobzar guild in Kyiv was initiated by followers and students of traditional bandurist Heorhy Tkachenko - Mykola Budnyk and Mykhailo Khai. The reason for the formation of the Kobzar guild was to have a formal organization to resurrect and reestablish forgotten traditions and to help deal with the needs of those bandurists who were interested in performing traditional music of the kobzars. The established regulated government institutions of the time were openly hostile to this group of bandurists, and as a result the Kyiv Kobzar guild was formed initially in opposition to the various formal music schools and conservatoria, as these structures had agendas which did not support authentic performance practice of traditional folk music.

The Kobzar Guild has grown into a significant movement and force in contemporary Ukrainian musical life. There are over 200 members and associates, with chapters in Kyiv, Kharkiv, Poltava and Lviv.

"Kobzarska Trijcia" Festival
The Kobzar Guild began festival life in 2008. The "Kobzarska Trijcia" (Kobzar Trinity) festival became regular. The festival's program consist of concerts, press-conferences, scientific conferences, exhibitions of traditional epic instruments and traditional dance-parties.

See also
Taras Kompanichenko
Eduard Drach
Volodymyr Kushpet

References
 Diakowsky, M. J. - The Bandura. The Ukrainian Trend, 1958, №I,  - С.18-36
 Haydamaka, L. – Kobza-bandura – National Ukrainian Musical Instrument. "Guitar Review" №33, Summer 1970 (С.13-18)
 Mishalow, V. - A Brief Description of the Zinkiv Method of Bandura Playing. Bandura, 1982, №2/6, - С.23-26
 Mishalow, V. - A Short History of the Bandura. East European Meetings in Ethnomusicology 1999, Romanian Society for Ethnomusicology, Volume 6, - С.69-86
 Mizynec, V. - Folk Instruments of Ukraine. Bayda Books, Melbourne, Australia, 1987 - 48с.
 Cherkaskyi, L. - Ukrainski narodni muzychni instrumenty. Tekhnika, Kyiv, Ukraine, 2003 - 262 pages. 

Kobzarstvo
Ukrainian musical groups
Bandurists